This is an incomplete list of notable people from Corsica or of Corsican descent.

Musicians
 Alizée (born 1984), singer
 Patrick Fiori (born 1969), singer
 Michel Giacometti (1929-1990), ethnomusicologist who worked primarily in Portugal
 Jenifer (born 1982), French singer of Corsican ancestry
 Henry Padovani (born 1952), guitarist and singer, founder member of The Police
Eddie Palmieri (born 1936), Puerto Rican pianist and composer of Corsican ancestry
 Antonio Paoli (1871-1946), Puerto Rican opera singer of Corsican ancestry
 Tino Rossi (1907-1983), singer and actor
 César Vezzani (1888-1951), opera singer

Politicians and leaders
 Sambucuccio d'Alando (14th century), revolutionary
 Diego Arria Saliceti (born 1938), Venezuelan economist, diplomat and polítician of Corsican ancestry
 John Bernard (1893-1983), American politician of Corsican ancestry
 Hammuda Bey (died 1666), Bey of Tunis (Corsican parents, Murad I Bey and Yasmine)
 Murad I Bey (born Jacques Senti, died 1631), Bey of Tunis
 Mariana Bracetti, Puerto Rican independist  of Corsican ancestry
Aristides Calvani (1918-1986), Venezuelan politician and lawyer of Corsican ancestry
 César Campinchi (1882-1941), politician and lawyer
Aníbal Dominici (1837-1897), Venezuelan politician and lawyer of Corsican ancestry
 César Campinchi (1882-1941), politician and lawyer
 Arthur Andrew Cipriani (1875-1945), Trinidadian politician of Corsican ancestry
 Hasan Corso (born Pietro Paolo Tavera, died 1556), caliph and mayor of Algiers
 Pasquino Corso (died 1532), military leader
 Sampiero Corso (1498-1567), military leader
 Juan Pablo Fernandini (1793-1842), Peruvian military leader of Corsican ancestry
 Petru Giovacchini (1910-1955), fascist and pro-Italian collaborator in World War II
 Arturo Hernandez Grisanti (1928-2008), Venezuelan writer politician of Corsican ancestry|
 Raul Leoni (1905-1972), president of Venezuela 1964-1969, of Corsican ancestry
 Jaime Lusinchi (1924-2014), president of Venezuela 1984-1989, of Corsican ancestry
 Norodom Monineath (born Paule Monique Izzi, 1936-), former queen consort of Cambodia (father of Corsican descent)
 Ángel Navarro (1748-1808), early Texas settler and mayor of San Antonio
 José Antonio Navarro (1795-1871), Texan politician of Corsican ancestry
 François-Xavier Ortoli (1925-2007), politician, former President of the European Commission
 Pasquale Paoli (1725-1807), Corsican patriot, statesman and military leader
 Charles Pasqua (1927-2015), French politician of Corsican ancestry
 Alicia Pietri (1923-2011), public figure of Corsican ancestry who twice served as First Lady of Venezuela (1969–1974 and 1994–1999)
 Carlo Andrea Pozzo di Borgo (1764-1842),  French politician and Russian diplomat
 Antoine Christophe Saliceti (1757-1809), politician, member of the National Convention during the French Revolution
 Norodom Sihamoni (1953-), King of Cambodia and son of Norodom Monineath
Leopoldo Sucre Figarella (1926-1996), Venezuelan politician of Corsican ancestry
 José Antonio Velutini (1844-1912), Venezuelan military of Corsican ancestry

Bonaparte family
 Napoléon Bonaparte (1769-1821), Emperor of France
 Carlo Bonaparte (1746-1785), father of Napoléon Bonaparte
 Caroline Bonaparte (1782-1839), sister of Napoléon Bonaparte
 Elisa Bonaparte (1777-1820), sister of Napoléon Bonaparte
 Jérôme Bonaparte (1784-1860), brother of Napoléon Bonaparte
 Joseph Bonaparte (1768-1844), brother of Napoléon Bonaparte
 Louis Bonaparte (1778-1846), brother of Napoléon Bonaparte
 Lucien Bonaparte (1775-1840), brother of Napoléon Bonaparte
 Pauline Bonaparte (1780-1825), sister of Napoléon Bonaparte
 Joseph Fesch (1763-1839), half-uncle of Napoléon Bonaparte
 Letizia Ramolino (1749-1836), mother of Napoléon Bonaparte

Scientists
 Ignace Cardini (1566-1602), naturalist, doctor and humanist
 Angelo Mariani (1838-1914), chemist
Andrés Antonio Pietri (1889-1956), physician
 Paul Vincensini (1896-1978), mathematician

Sportspeople
 Maxime Chevalier (born 1999), cyclist
 Laurent Lokoli (born 1994), tennis player
 Salim Sdiri (born 1978), long jumper

Football
 Chahir Belghazouani (born 1986), former Moroccan international
 Chaouki Ben Saada (born 1984), Tunisian international
 Rémy Cabella (born 1990), French international
 Dominique Colonna (born 1928), former French international
 Adama Diakhaby (born 1996), current player
 Wahbi Khazri (born 1991), Tunisian international
 François Modesto (born 1978), former player
 Pascal Olmeta (born 1961), former player
 Olivier Pantaloni, (born 1966), former player
 Charles Orlanducci (born 1951), former French international
 Claude Papi (1949-1983), former French international
 Nicolas Penneteau (born 1981), current player
 Adil Rami (born 1985), French international, 2018 World Cup winner
 Albert Vanucci (born 1947), former French international

Writers
 Michel Ferracci-Porri (born 1949), writer
 Juan Liscano (1915-2001), Venezuelan poet, writer, folklorist, editor of Corsican ancestry
Francisco Massiani (1944-2019), Venezuelan writer of Corsican ancestry
 Arturo Uslar Pietri (1906-2001), Venezuelan writer and politician of Corsican ancestry

Fashion
 Laetitia Casta (born 1978), French model and actress of Corsican ancestry
 Garance Doré (born 1975), fashion blogger
 Baptiste Giabiconi (born 1989), French model and singer of Corsican ancestry

Miscellaneous
 Danielle Casanova (1909-1943), World War II Resistance heroine
 Vincent de Moro-Giafferi (1878-1956), French lawyer and politician of Corsican ancestry
 Anita Fernandini de Naranjo (1902–1982), Peruvian heiress and politician of Corsican ancestry
 Antonio Liccioni (1817-1901), French gold miner entrepreneur of El Callao, Venezuela
 Marie-Claude Pietragalla (born 1963), French dancer and choreographer of Corsican ancestry
Leon Santelli Gelormini (1844-1925), Venezuelan  rum Master of Corsican ancestry
Espartaco Santoni (1937-1998), Venezuelan actor of Corsican ancestry
 Bartolomé Tavera Acosta (1865-1931), Venezuelan historian, ethnologist, linguist and journalist of Corsican ancestry
Luis Emilio Velutini (born 1953), Venezuelan businessman of Corsican ancestry

See also
 List of Sardinians
 Lists of people by nationality

Corsican
Corsican
People from Corsica